The Bishops' Conference of France (CEF) is the national episcopal conference of the bishops of the Catholic Church in France.

Presidents

Presidents of the Assembly of Cardinals and Archbishops of France (1945–1966):

Presidents of the conference:

 (2019–present) Éric de Moulins-Beaufort, Archbishop of Reims

Sex abuse

On November 9, 2019, the large majority of the 120 Bishops who are members of Conference of French Bishops approved a resolution agreeing that every French Catholic Bishop would pay compensation for abuse which took place in the French Catholic Church. The size of the payouts was later be determined in April 2020.

In June 2019 the bishops set up the Independent Commission on Sexual Abuse in the Church (abbreviated CIASE. It was led by the former civil servant Jean-Marc Sauvé. In 2019, the commission stated that 3,000 children in France were sexually abused by Catholic clergy and officials since 1950 and that there was an average of 40 victims per year. In its final report, published on 5 October 2021, the commission concluded that in fact, around 216,000 children had been abused by clergy during this time. When including sexual abuse committed by lay members of the church, such as teachers at Catholic schools, they estimated 330,000 child victims.

After the publication, the archbishop of Reims, Éric de Moulins-Beaufort claimed that Catholic priests were not obliged to report sex abuse confessed to them under confessional secrecy. However, French law states that anyone aware of a sexual crime against a minor must report it to the authorities. Otherwise, they risk heavy fines and imprisonment. French president Emmanuel Macron therefore summoned the archbishop to the ministry of the interior, where interior minister Gérald Darmarin received the cleric "to make sure that things are clear”.

See also
Catholic Church in France
List of Bishops in France

References

External links
 

France
Catholic Church in France
Christian organizations established in 1966
Catholic organizations established in the 20th century